David Stuart Chadwick (10 December 1941 – 20 December 2020) was an English musician and producer, best known as Chad Stuart of 1960's British Invasion duo Chad & Jeremy.

Stuart has writing credits on four of the 11 Chad & Jeremy songs which entered the U.S. Hot 100. Stuart has sole credit for the duo's first hit, "Yesterday's Gone" (their only hit in the UK), and credits on "You Are She" (Stuart/Clyde), and "A Summer Song" (Stuart/Metcalfe/Noble), and "What Do You Want With Me" (Stuart/Clyde).

Early life 

Stuart was born on 10 December 1941 in Windermere, Westmorland, a town in the North West of England.  His father, Frank Chadwick, was a foreman in the lumber industry and his mother, Frieda Chadwick (née Bedford), was a nurse. At five, Stuart's family moved to Hartlepool in the North East of England when his father's job was transferred.

At 10, Stuart was recognized for his musical talent and earned a scholarship to attend the Durham Cathedral Chorister School. After graduation, Stuart briefly attended an art school for a year before switching to drama. Stuart won a scholarship to the Central School of Speech and Drama in London. There, Stuart met fellow student Jeremy Clyde.

Career 

Stuart began working with Clyde as the British music duo Chad & Jeremy in 1962 and they had their first hit song in the UK with "Yesterday's Gone" (1963). That song became a hit in the United States in the following year as part of the British Invasion. The duo had a string of hits in the United States, including "Willow Weep for Me", "Before and After", and their biggest hit, "A Summer Song". After some commercial failures and divergent personal ambitions, Chad & Jeremy disbanded in 1968. In the early 1980s, the duo reunited to record a new album and perform concerts, including a multi-band British Invasion nostalgia tour.

Following the breakup of Chad & Jeremy, Stuart worked as a staff producer at A&M Records and musical director for the Smothers Brothers. Over the years, Stuart and Clyde reunited to record and tour. In 2003, the duo were officially reunited again and had a semi-regular touring schedule until Stuart's retirement in 2016.

On 20 December 2020, Stuart died of pneumonia following a fall.

Personal life 
Stuart was called Chad as a teenager and legally changed his name in 1964. In 1964, Stuart married his first wife, English model Jill Gibson, whom he met while attending the Central School of Speech and Drama.

Stuart has several children and step-children. One of Stuart's sons, from his first marriage, is American television, film, and voice actor James Patrick Stuart.

Stuart later settled in the state of Idaho in the northwestern U.S.A.

Stuart supported and donated to Habitat for Humanity, the Humane Society, Horse Rescue, and other benefits. All profits from CD sales of his 2013 album Chad Stuart & the KGB went to stopping the slaughter of wild horses.

Partial discography

With Chad & Jeremy 
 Yesterday's Gone (July 1964)
 Chad & Jeremy Sing for You (January 1965)
 Before and After (1965)
 I Don't Want to Lose You Baby (1965)
 Second Album (1966)
 Distant Shores (1966)
 Of Cabbages and Kings (1967)
 The Ark (1968)
 3 in the Attic (1968)
 Chad Stuart & Jeremy Clyde (1983)
 In Concert (The Official Bootleg) (2002)
 Ark-eology (2008)
 Fifty Years On (2010)

Solo 
 "The Cruel War"/"I Can't Talk to You" (Chad & Jill single, 1966)
 Don't Argue with an Elephant (2010)
 Chad Stuart and the KGB (2013)

As producer 
(List may be incomplete)

References

External links 
 Official website
 Chad Stuart at Discogs

People from Windermere, Cumbria

Chad & Jeremy albums
English rock musicians
1941 births
2020 deaths
Deaths from pneumonia in Idaho
Deaths from falls